Aaron Siskind (December 4, 1903 – February 8, 1991) was an American photographer whose work focuses on the details of things, presented as flat surfaces to create a new image independent of the original subject. He was closely involved with, if not a part of, the abstract expressionist movement, and was close friends with painters Franz Kline (whose own breakthrough show at the Charles Egan Gallery occurred in the same period as Siskind's one-man shows at the same gallery), Mark Rothko,  and Willem de Kooning.

Life 
Siskind was born in New York City, growing up on the Lower East Side. Shortly after graduating from City College, he became a public school English teacher. Siskind was a grade school English teacher in the New York Public School System for 25 years, and began photography when he received a camera as a wedding gift and began taking pictures on his honeymoon.

Early in his career Siskind was a member of the New York Photo League, where he produced several significant socially conscious series of images in the 1930s, among them "Harlem Document".

In the 1940s, Siskind lived above the Corner Book Shop, at 102 Fourth Avenue in Manhattan; he also maintained a darkroom at this location.

In 1950 Siskind met Harry Callahan when both were teaching at Black Mountain College in the summer, where he also met Robert Rauschenberg who throughout his life always kept a particular Siskind print on his work wall (see MOMA retrospective 2017). Later, Callahan persuaded Siskind to join him as part of the faculty of the IIT Institute of Design in Chicago (founded by László Moholy-Nagy as the New Bauhaus). In 1971 he followed Callahan (who had left in 1961) by his invitation to teach at the Rhode Island School of Design, until both retired in the late 1970s.

Siskind used subject material from the real world: close-up details of painted walls and graffiti, tar repair on asphalt pavement, rocks, lava flows, dappled shadows on an old horse, Olmec stone heads, ancient statuary and the Arch of Constantine in Rome, and a series of nudes ("Louise").

Siskind worked all over the world, visiting Mexico in 1955 and the 1970s, and Rome in 1963 and 1967. He did the Tar Series in Providence, Vermont, and Route 88 near Westport, Rhode Island, in the 1980s. He continued making photographs until his death from a stroke on February 8, 1991.

Publications 
 Bucks County: Photographs of Early Architecture. Horizon, 1974. .
 Places: Aaron Siskind Photographs. Siskind and Thomas B. Hess. Farrar, Straus & Giroux, 1976. .
 Harlem Document Photographs 1932 1940: Aaron Siskind. Matrix, 1981. .
 Road Trip: Photographs 1980-1988 (Untitled 49). Friends of Photography, 1989. .
 Harlem Photographs 1932-1940. Smithsonian, 1990. .
 Aaron Siskind 100. powerHouse, 2003. .

Collections
Art Institute of Chicago, Chicago, IL: 256 prints (as of March 2019)
San Francisco Museum of Modern Art, San Francisco, CA: 18 prints (as of March 2019)
J. Paul Getty Museum, Los Angeles, California: 351 works (as of November 2019)
Museum of Modern Art, New York: 98 works (as of November 2019)
Metropolitan Museum of Art, New York: 152 works (as of September 2020)

References

Further reading 
 Rosenblum, Harold. Siskind, Photographs. Horizon, 1959
 Rhem, James. Aaron Siskind. Phaidon, 2012
 Marika Herskovic, New York School Abstract Expressionists Artists Choice by Artists, New York School Press, 2000 
Mason Klein and Catherine Evans, The Radical Camera: New York's PhotoLeague 1936-1951, Yale University Press and The Jewish Museum, 2011

External links 

 Aaron Siskind Foundation
 Siskind at Pitzer College Art Galleries in the Claremont Colleges Digital Library

1903 births
1991 deaths
20th-century American photographers
Photographers from New York (state)
Jewish American artists
Illinois Institute of Technology faculty
20th-century American Jews